John Wilkie was a Scottish footballer who played in the Football League for Blackburn Rovers and Middlesbrough.

He began his career with Partick Thistle, and returned to the club eight years later for a second spell. He played alongside former Jags left-wing teammate John Campbell at Blackburn and Rangers, and would do so again briefly at Hibernian.

At Rangers, he had a minor role in the club's perfect season of 1898–99 (18 league wins from 18 matches) and played more often as they retained the SFL title in 1899–1900, and in a third championship season in 1901–02. He also claimed Glasgow Cup medals in the latter two seasons.

Wilkie was selected for the Home Scots v Anglo-Scots international trial match in 1898 while with Blackburn, and again in 1904 while with Partick, but this did not lead to a cap for Scotland on either occasion.

References

1876 births
Date of death unknown
Scottish footballers
English Football League players
Association football forwards
Partick Thistle F.C. players
Blackburn Rovers F.C. players
Rangers F.C. players
Middlesbrough F.C. players
Hibernian F.C. players
Ayr Parkhouse F.C. players
Scottish Football League players
Footballers from Glasgow
People from Govan